Idbyån is a river in northern Sweden.

See Also
 List of rivers of Sweden

References

Rivers of Västernorrland County